Ronald David Law (born March 14, 1946) is a Canadian former professional baseball pitcher who appeared in 35 games for the 1969 Cleveland Indians. Born in Hamilton, Ontario, Law threw and batted right-handed.

Law's ten-season pro career began in the Chicago Cubs' organization in 1964. He was acquired by Cleveland in the 1968 minor league draft, and spent the early months of the 1969 season with Waterbury of the Double-A Eastern League, compiling an 8–4 won–lost record. Recalled to Cleveland in June, Law appeared in 34 games in relief and made one start. He won three games and saved another. In his lone start, July 8 at RFK Stadium against the Washington Senators, he lasted only 2 innings and allowed five hits, two bases on balls and five earned runs. But the Indians battled back to win the game, 6–5.

All told, Law worked in 52 MLB innings, permitting 68 hits and 34 bases on balls. He recorded 29 strikeouts. During the off-season, on December 5, he was traded to Washington with pitcher Horacio Piña and infielder Dave Nelson for pitchers Dennis Higgins and Barry Moore.  He pitched at Triple-A for the rest of his career, including service in the Mexican League, and retired from the field in 1973.

References

External links

1946 births
Living people
Baseball players from Hamilton, Ontario
Canadian expatriate baseball players in Mexico
Canadian expatriate baseball players in the United States
Charros de Jalisco players
Cleveland Indians players
Dallas–Fort Worth Spurs players
Denver Bears players
Lodi Crushers players
Major League Baseball pitchers
Major League Baseball players from Canada
Quincy Cubs players
San Antonio Missions players
Tacoma Twins players
Treasure Valley Cubs players
Waterbury Indians players